Harriet Helena Scott (born February 16, 1961) is an American Democratic politician from Michigan. She was elected to the Michigan House of Representatives from the 7th district in 2020.

References

External links 
 Official website

Living people
Democratic Party members of the Michigan House of Representatives
Politicians from Detroit
African-American state legislators in Michigan
Women state legislators in Michigan
21st-century American politicians
21st-century American women politicians
African-American women in politics
21st-century African-American women
21st-century African-American politicians
1961 births
20th-century African-American people
20th-century African-American women